Norman Yoshio Mineta (November 12, 1931 – May 3, 2022) was an American politician. A member of the Democratic Party, Mineta served in the United States Cabinet for Presidents Bill Clinton, a Democrat, and George W. Bush, a Republican.

Mineta served as the mayor of San Jose from 1971 until 1975. He was a member of the United States House of Representatives, representing California from 1975 until 1995. Mineta served as the United States Secretary of Commerce during the final months of Bill Clinton's presidency. He was the first person of East Asian descent to serve as a U.S. cabinet secretary.

As the United States Secretary of Transportation for President Bush, Mineta was the only Democratic cabinet secretary in the Bush administration. He oversaw the creation of the Transportation Security Administration in response to the September 11 attacks that had occurred early in his tenure. On June 23, 2006, Mineta announced his resignation after more than five years as Secretary of Transportation, effective July 7, 2006, making him the longest-serving Secretary of Transportation in the department's history. A month later, public-relations firm Hill+Knowlton Strategies announced that Mineta would join it as a partner. In 2010, it was announced that Mineta would join L&L Energy, Inc. as vice chairman.

Mineta died on May 3, 2022, from a heart ailment in Edgewater, Maryland, at the age of 90.

Early life and education
Mineta was born in San Jose, California, to Japanese immigrant parents Kunisaku Mineta and Kane Watanabe, who were barred from becoming American citizens at that time by the Asian Exclusion Act. During World War II, the Mineta family was interned for several years at Area 24, 7th Barrack, Unit B, in the Heart Mountain internment camp near Cody, Wyoming, along with thousands of other Japanese immigrants and Japanese Americans. Upon arrival to the camp, Mineta, a baseball fan, had his baseball bat confiscated by authorities because it could be used as a weapon. Many years later, after Mineta was elected to the U.S. House of Representatives, a man sent Mineta a $1,500 bat that was once owned by Hank Aaron, which Mineta was forced to return as it violated the congressional ban on gifts valued over $250. Mineta said: "The damn government's taken my bat again."

While detained in the camp, Mineta, a Boy Scout, met fellow scout Alan K. Simpson, a future senator from Wyoming, who often visited the Boy Scouts in the internment camp with his troop. The two became close friends and remained political allies throughout their lives.

Mineta graduated from the University of California, Berkeley's School of Business Administration in 1953 with a degree in business administration. Upon graduation, Mineta joined the U.S. Army and served as an intelligence officer in Japan and Korea. He then joined his father in the Mineta Insurance Agency.

Career

Councilman and mayor of San Jose
In 1967, Mineta was appointed to a vacant San Jose City Council seat by mayor Ron James. He was elected to office for the first time after completing a term in the city council. He was elected vice mayor by fellow councilors during that term.

Mineta ran against 14 other candidates in the 1971 election to replace outgoing mayor Ron James. Mineta won every precinct in the election with over 60% of the total vote and became the 59th mayor of San Jose, the first Japanese-American mayor of a major American city. As mayor, Mineta ended the city's 20-year-old policy of rapid growth by annexation, creating development-free areas in East and South San Jose. His vice mayor Janet Gray Hayes succeeded him as mayor in 1975.

United States Congress
In 1974, Mineta ran for the United States House of Representatives in what was then . The district had previously been the 10th District, represented by retiring 11-term Republican Charles Gubser. Mineta won the Democratic nomination and defeated State Assemblyman George W. Milias with 52 percent of the vote. He was reelected 10 more times from this Silicon Valley-based district, which was renumbered as the 15th District in 1993, never dropping below 57 percent of the vote.

Mineta cofounded the Congressional Asian Pacific American Caucus and served as its first chair. He served as chairman of the House Committee on Transportation and Infrastructure between 1992 and 1994. He chaired the committee's aviation subcommittee between 1981 and 1988, and chaired its Surface Transportation subcommittee from 1989 to 1991.

During his career in Congress, Mineta was a key author of the landmark Intermodal Surface Transportation Efficiency Act of 1991. He pressed for more funding for the Federal Aviation Administration. Mineta was a driving force behind passage of H.R. 442, which became the Civil Liberties Act of 1988, a law that officially apologized for and redressed the injustices endured by Japanese Americans during World War II.

Private sector
Mineta resigned his seat mid-term to accept a position with Lockheed Martin in 1995. He chaired the National Civil Aviation Review Commission, which in 1997 issued recommendations on minimizing traffic congestion and reducing the aviation accident rate. Many of the commission's recommendations were adopted by the Clinton administration, including reform of the Federal Aviation Administration to enable it to perform more like a business.

In 1999, Mineta received the L. Welch Pogue Award for Lifetime Achievement in Aviation.

Mineta was appointed to the board of directors of Horizon Lines effective January 1, 2007. He had formerly served on the board of AECOM Technology Corporation and was on the board of SJW Corp.

Secretary of Commerce
In 2000, President Bill Clinton nominated Mineta to serve as the U.S. Secretary of Commerce, making him the first Asian American to hold a presidential cabinet post. Clinton had wanted to nominate Mineta as U.S. Secretary of Transportation in 1992, but Mineta wanted to remain in Congress at that time.

Secretary of Transportation
Mineta was appointed United States Secretary of Transportation by President George W. Bush in 2001, a post that he was offered eight years earlier by Bill Clinton. He was the only Democrat to have served in Bush's cabinet and the first Secretary of Transportation to have previously served in a cabinet position. He became the first Asian American to hold the position, and only the fourth person to be a member of Cabinet under two presidents from different political parties (after Edwin M. Stanton, Henry L. Stimson and James R. Schlesinger). In 2004, Mineta received the Tony Jannus Award for his distinguished contributions to commercial air transportation.

Following Bush's reelection, Mineta was invited to continue in the position, and he did so until resigning in June 2006. When he stepped down on July 7, 2006, he was the longest-serving Secretary of Transportation since the position's inception in 1967.

September 11 attacks
Mineta's testimony to the 9/11 Commission about his experience in the Presidential Emergency Operations Center with Vice President Cheney as American Airlines flight 77 approached the Pentagon was not included in the 9/11 Commission Report. In one colloquy testified by Mineta, the vice president refers to orders concerning the plane approaching the Pentagon:

Commissioner Lee Hamilton queried if the order was to shoot down the plane, to which Mineta replied that he did not know that specifically.

Mineta's testimony to the commission on Flight 77 differs rather significantly from the account provided in the January 22, 2002, edition of The Washington Post, as reported by Bob Woodward and Dan Balz in their series "10 Days in September".

This same article reports that the conversation between Cheney and the aide occurred at 9:55 a.m., about 30 minutes later than the time that Mineta had cited (9:26 a.m.) during his testimony to the 9/11 Commission.

After hearing of Mineta's orders, Canadian transport minister David Collenette issued orders to ground all civilian aircraft traffic across Canada, resulting in Operation Yellow Ribbon. On September 21, 2001, Mineta sent a letter to all U.S. airlines forbidding them from practicing racial profiling or subjecting Middle Eastern or Muslim passengers to a heightened degree of pre-flight scrutiny. He stated that it was illegal for the airlines to discriminate against passengers based on their race, color, national or ethnic origin or religion. Subsequently, administrative enforcement actions were brought against three airlines based on alleged contraventions of these rules, resulting in multimillion-dollar settlements. Mineta voiced his intention to "absolutely not" implement racial screenings in a 60 Minutes interview just after 9/11. He later recalled his decision "was the right thing [and] constitutional" based on his own experience as a member of those who had "lost the most basic human rights" as a result of the internment of Japanese Americans during World War II.

The Norman Y. Mineta San Jose International Airport in San Jose was named after Mineta in November 2001 while he was serving as Secretary of Transportation. The Mineta Transportation Institute, located at San Jose State University, and portions of California State Highway 85 are named after him.

White House Press Secretary Tony Snow announced on June 23, 2006, that Mineta would resign effective July 7, 2006, because "he wanted to." A spokesman said that Mineta was "moving on to pursue other challenges." He left office as the longest-serving Secretary of Transportation in history.

After leaving the Bush administration

Hill+Knowlton announced on July 10, 2006, that Mineta would join the firm as vice chairman, effective July 24, 2006.

In 2005, Mineta received the Golden Plate Award of the American Academy of Achievement presented by Awards Council member and Google cofounder Larry Page. In October 2006, Mineta won the Wright Brothers Memorial Trophy. In December 2006, he was awarded the Presidential Medal of Freedom. In 2007, the Japanese government conferred upon him the Grand Cordon, Order of the Rising Sun.

On February 4, 2008, the day before the closely contested California Democratic primary, Mineta endorsed Barack Obama.

Beginning in summer 2008, Mineta began service as chairman of a panel of the National Academy of Public Administration overseeing a study of modernization efforts at the United States Coast Guard. Other notable members of the panel include former Office of Personnel Management director Janice Lachance and former NASA administrator Sean O'Keefe.

In June 2010, Mineta was named co-chair of the Joint Ocean Commission Initiative. On August 10, 2010, he was named vice chairman of L&L Energy, Inc. which was headquartered in Seattle and operated coal mines and other facilities related to coal production in China.

Mineta was a recipient of the Chubb Fellowship at Yale University from 2015–2016.

Legacy 
The Mineta Transportation Institute was named after him. It was established by Congress in 1991 as a research institute focusing on issues related to intermodal surface transportation in the United States. It is part of San Jose State University's Lucas Graduate School of Business in San Jose, California, and is currently directed by Karen Philbrick. In 2001, the San Jose International Airport adopted his name to honor him while he was serving as the US Secretary of Transportation.

Personal life
Mineta's first marriage was to May Hinoki, which lasted from 1961 to 1986. In 1991, Mineta married United Airlines flight attendant Danealia "Deni" Brantner. Mineta had two children from his first marriage and two stepchildren from his second marriage. He had 11 grandchildren.

Mineta died on May 3, 2022, from a heart ailment in Edgewater, Maryland, at the age of 90.

See also

 List of United States political appointments across party lines
 List of Asian Americans and Pacific Islands Americans in the United States Congress

References

External links

 The Mineta Legacy Project

Norman Mineta at Find a Grave

|-

|-

|-

|-

|-

|-

|-

1931 births
2022 deaths
20th-century American politicians
21st-century American politicians
American mayors of Japanese descent
American military personnel of Japanese descent
American politicians of Japanese descent
Asian-American members of the United States House of Representatives
Berkeley Student Cooperative alumni
Burials at Oak Hill Memorial Park
California politicians of Japanese descent
Clinton administration cabinet members
Democratic Party members of the United States House of Representatives from California
George W. Bush administration cabinet members
Haas School of Business alumni
Japanese-American internees
Japanese-American members of the Cabinet of the United States
Mayors of San Jose, California
Members of the United States Congress of Japanese descent
Military personnel from California
Presidential Medal of Freedom recipients
Grand Cordons of the Order of the Rising Sun
San Jose City Council members
Asian-American city council members
United States Army officers
United States Secretaries of Commerce
United States Secretaries of Transportation
University of California, Berkeley alumni
Members of Congress who became lobbyists